Mihalache, a name common in Romania, may refer to any of the following:

Dan Mihalache, politician
Ion Mihalache, politician
Marius Mihalache, cimbalom player

See also 
 Mihai (name)
 Mihăilă (surname)
 Mihăești (disambiguation)
 Mihăiești (disambiguation)
 Mihăileni (disambiguation)
 Mihăilești

Romanian-language surnames